Ophiusa trapezium is a moth of the family Erebidae first described by Achille Guenée in 1852. It is found from the Indo-Australian tropics of India, Sri Lanka to Queensland, the Bismarck Islands and New Caledonia. Adults are fruit piercers.

Description
It has a wingspan of 66 mm. The head and thorax are bright rufous. Shaft of antennae whitish. Abdomen brownish fuscous. Forewings bright rufous suffused with purplish as far as the postmedial line and beyond the submarginal line. There is an outwardly oblique antemedial line jointed at inner margin by the obliquely waved postmedial line. The reniform with rufous outline. A double sub-marginal straight line and marginal dentate line. Hindwings brownish ochreous. The inner area clothed with fuscous hair. A broad diffused sub-marginal fuscous band present. Ventral side brownish ochreous. Forewings with fuscous cell and a submarginal patch.

Larvae have been reared on Melaleuca species (Myrtaceae) and Melastoma malabathricum (Melastomataceae).

Gallery

References

"Fruit-piercing moth Ophiusa trapezium (Guenée) (Lepidoptera: Noctuidae: Catocalinae)". Pest and Diseases Image Library. Archived from the original 20 August 2008.

Ophiusa
Moths of Japan
Moths described in 1852